Newbury West Fields Halt was a railway station in Newbury, Berkshire, UK, on the Lambourn Valley Railway.

History 
The station opened on 1 October 1906; the last station on the line to open.  It was built as part of an improvement programme undertaken after the Great Western Railway's acquisition of the line on 2 July 1906.

Until 1934, the station was staffed.  In September 1956, Newbury West Fields Halt was removed from the rail timetables but continued to carry passengers, small goods, and milk. The station closed on 4 February 1957, the first on the line to do so. The station was demolished after closure and the site of the railway formation is now covered by housing development.

References 

Newbury, Berkshire
Lambourn Valley Railway
Disused railway stations in Berkshire
Former Great Western Railway stations
Railway stations in Great Britain opened in 1906
Railway stations in Great Britain closed in 1957